Óscar Pedro Cano Moreno (born 6 November 1972) is a Spanish football manager, currently with Deportivo de La Coruña.

Manager career
Born in Granada, Andalusia, Cano began his managerial career at lowly CD Imperio de Albolote and subsequently managed neighbours Arenas CD in Tercera División, before moving to Segunda División B side CD Baza in the 2006 summer. After taking the club to an historical 12th position, he was appointed at the helm of Granada CF, also in the third level.

In October 2008, Cano left the club and was appointed Polideportivo Ejido manager in January 2010. On 1 July 2010 he was appointed at Segunda División's UD Salamanca, replacing resigned Jorge D'Alessandro.

Cano was sacked by the Charros on 14 February 2011, after suffering ten consecutive defeats. On 26 July, he joined UD Melilla, leaving the club in June 2012.

On 10 December 2012, Cano was appointed at the helm of Real Betis B, replacing fired Puma. After achieving promotion back to the third level at the end of the 2013–14 campaign, he signed for CD Alcoyano; he was sacked on 16 February 2015, after only winning three points out of 18.

On 14 July 2015, Cano was named Elche CF Ilicitano manager, but resigned on 3 August due to the club's poor in and out field situation.

Cano was hired by third-tier club CD Castellón on 10 December 2018, after the dismissal of David Gutiérrez. In his first full season with the Valencians, they won their group before defeating UE Cornellà in a single-leg playoff final at La Rosaleda Stadium to return to the second division for the first time in a decade.

On 11 January 2021, Cano left the Orelluts on a mutual agreement. He took over Primera División RFEF side CD Badajoz on 1 July, but was sacked on 8 February 2022.

Managerial statistics

References

External links
 

1972 births
Living people
Sportspeople from Granada
Spanish football managers
Segunda División managers
Primera Federación managers
Segunda División B managers
Tercera División managers
Granada CF managers
Polideportivo Ejido managers
UD Salamanca managers
CD Alcoyano managers
Elche CF Ilicitano managers
CD Castellón managers
CD Badajoz managers
Deportivo de La Coruña managers